Group G of UEFA Euro 2024 qualifying is one of the ten groups to decide which teams will qualify for the UEFA Euro 2024 final tournament in Germany. Group G consists of five teams: Bulgaria, Hungary, Lithuania, Montenegro and Serbia. The teams will play against each other home-and-away in a round-robin format.

The top two teams will qualify directly for the final tournament. The participants of the qualifying play-offs will be decided based on their performance in the 2022–23 UEFA Nations League.

Standings

Matches
The fixture list was confirmed by UEFA on 10 October 2022, the day after the draw. Times are CET/CEST, as listed by UEFA (local times, if different, are in parentheses).

Discipline
A player is automatically suspended for the next match for the following offences:
 Receiving a red card (red card suspensions may be extended for serious offences)
 Receiving three yellow cards in three different matches, as well as after fifth and any subsequent yellow card (yellow card suspensions are not carried forward to the play-offs, the finals or any other future international matches)

The following suspensions will be served during the qualifying matches:

Notes

References

External links
UEFA Euro 2024, UEFA.com
European Qualifiers, UEFA.com

Group G
2022–23 in Bulgarian football

2022–23 in Hungarian football

2023 in Lithuanian football
2022–23 in Montenegrin football

2022–23 in Serbian football